USS LST-919 was an  in the United States Navy. Like many of her class, she was not named and is properly referred to by her hull designation.

Construction
LST-919 was laid down on 11 April 1944, at Hingham, Massachusetts, by the Bethlehem-Hingham Shipyard; launched on 17 May 1944;  and commissioned on 31 May 1944.

Service history
During World War II, LST-919 was assigned to the Asiatic-Pacific theater and took part in the Leyte landings in October and November 1944, the Lingayen Gulf landings in January 1945, and the Mindanao Island landings in April 1945.

Following the war, LST-919 performed occupation duty in the Far East and saw service in China until early April 1946. She returned to the United States and was decommissioned on 5 August 1946, and struck from the Navy list on 25 September, that same year. On 10 January 1948, the ship was sold to Pablo N. Ferrari & Co. for operation. On 1 March 1948, she was resold to the government of Argentina.

Argentine service 
In Argentine service, LST-919 was renamed Cabo San Isidro and redesignated BDT-6 (Buque Desembarco de Tanques), later Q46. She was retired in 1979.  She still existed at the time of the Falklands War, but was not available for use.

Awards
LST-919 earned three battle stars for World War II service.

Notes

Citations

Bibliography 

Online resources
 
 
 
Printed resources

External links
 

 

LST-542-class tank landing ships
World War II amphibious warfare vessels of the United States
Ships built in Hingham, Massachusetts
1944 ships
LST-542-class tank landing ships of the Argentine Navy
Ships transferred from the United States Navy to the Argentine Navy